An ethnocracy is a type of political structure in which the state apparatus is controlled by a dominant ethnic group (or groups) to further its interests, power and resources. Ethnocratic regimes in the modern era typically display a 'thin' democratic façade covering a more profound ethnic structure, in which ethnicity (race, religion, language etc) – and not citizenship – is the key to securing power and resources.

An ethnocratic society facilitates the ethnicization of the state by the dominant group, through the expansion of control likely accompanied by conflict with minorities or neighbouring states. A theory of ethnocratic regimes was developed by critical geographer Oren Yiftachel during the 1990s and later developed by a range of international scholars.

Characteristics, structure, and dynamics 
In the 20th century, a few states passed (or attempted to pass) nationality laws through efforts that share certain similarities. All took place in countries with at least one national minority that sought full equality in the state or in a territory that had become part of the state and in which it had lived for generations. Nationality laws were passed in societies that felt threatened by these minorities' aspirations of integration and demands for equality, resulting in regimes that turned xenophobia into major tropes. These laws were grounded in one ethnic identity, defined in contrast to the identity of the other, leading to persecution of and codified discrimination against minorities.

Research shows that several spheres of control are vital for ethnocratic regimes, including of the armed forces, police, land administration, immigration and economic development. These powerful government instruments may ensure domination by the leading ethnic groups and the stratification of society into 'ethnoclasses' (exacerbated by 20th century capitalism's typically neo-liberal policies). Ethnocracies often manage to contain ethnic conflict in the short term by effective control over minorities and by effectively using the 'thin' procedural democratic façade. However, they tend to become unstable in the longer term, suffering from repeated conflict and crisis, which are resolved by either substantive democratization, partition, or regime devolution into consociational arrangements. Alternatively, ethnocracies that do not resolve their internal conflict may deteriorate into periods of long-term internal strife and the institutionalization of structural discrimination (such as apartheid).

In ethnocratic states, the government is typically representative of a particular ethnic group, which holds a disproportionately large number of posts. The dominant ethnic group (or groups) uses them to advance the position of their particular ethnic group(s) to the detriment of others. Other ethnic groups are systematically discriminated against and may face repression or violations of their human rights at the hands of state organs. Ethnocracy can also be a political regime instituted on the basis of qualified rights to citizenship, with ethnic affiliation (defined in terms of race, descent, religion, or language) as the distinguishing principle. All other considerations concerning the distribution of power are ultimately subordinated to this basic intention.

Ethnocracies are characterized by their control system – the legal, institutional, and physical instruments of power deemed necessary to secure ethnic dominance. The degree of system discrimination will tend to vary greatly from case to case and from situation to situation. If the dominant group (whose interests the system is meant to serve and whose identity it is meant to represent) constitutes a small minority (typically 20% or less) of the population within the state territory, substantial institutionalized suppression will probably be necessary to sustain its control.

Means of avoiding ethnocracy
One view is that the most effective means of eliminating ethnic discrimination vary depending on the specific situation. In the Caribbean, a "rainbow nationalism" type of non-ethnic, inclusive civic nationalism has been developed as a way to eliminate ethnic power hierarchies over time. (Although Creole peoples are central in the Caribbean, Eric Kauffman warns against conflating the presence of a dominant ethnicity in such countries with ethnic nationalism.)

Andreas Wimmler notes that a non-ethnic federal system without minority rights has helped Switzerland to avoid ethnocracy but that this did not help in overcoming ethnic discrimination when introduced in Bolivia. Likewise, ethnic federalism "produced benign results in India and Canada" but did not work in Nigeria and Ethiopia. Edward E. Telles notes that anti-discrimination legislation may not work as well in Brazil as in the U.S. at addressing ethnoracial inequalities, since much of the discrimination that occurs in Brazil is class-based, and Brazilian judges and police often ignore laws that are intended to benefit non-elites.

Mono-ethnocracy vs. poly-ethnocracy
In October 2012, Lise Morjé Howard introduced the terms mono-ethnocracy and poly-ethnocracy.  Mono-ethnocracy is a type of regime where one ethnic group dominates, which conforms with the traditional understanding of ethnocracy. Poly-ethnocracy is a type of regime where more than one ethnic group governs the state. Both mono- and poly-ethnocracy are types of ethnocracy. Ethnocracy is founded on the assumptions that ethnic groups are primordial, ethnicity is the basis of political identity, and citizens rarely sustain multiple ethnic identities.

Ethnocracies around the world

Belgium
Lise Morjé Howard has labeled Belgium as both a poly-ethnocracy and a democracy. Citizens in Belgium exercise political rights found in democracies, such as voting and free speech. However, Belgian politics is increasingly defined by ethnic divisions between the Flemish and Francophone communities. For example, all the major political parties are formed around either a Flemish or Francophone identity. Furthermore, bilingual education has disappeared from most Francophone schools.

Malaysia

Malaysia has been labeled as a pro-Bumiputera/Malay ethnocracy by various academics due to the Article 153 of the Constitution of Malaysia, as well as the Ketuanan Melayu (Malay supremacy) ideology, which gives them more economic, political and social rights over the Malaysian minorities such as the Malaysian Chinese and Malaysian Indians, who are treated as de facto second-class citizens.

Opposition groups, government critics and human rights observers has even labeled the Malaysian situation as being highly similar to apartheid policies.

Israel
Israel has been labeled an ethnocracy by scholars such as Alexander Kedar, Shlomo Sand, Oren Yiftachel, Asaad Ghanem, Haim Yakobi, Nur Masalha and Hannah Naveh.

However, scholars such as Gershon Shafir, Yoav Peled and Sammy Smooha prefer the term ethnic democracy to describe Israel, which is intended to represent a "middle ground" between an ethnocracy and a liberal democracy. Smooha in particular argues that ethnocracy, allowing a privileged status to a dominant ethnic majority while ensuring that all individuals have equal rights, is defensible. His opponents reply that insofar as Israel contravenes equality in practice, the term 'democratic' in his equation is flawed.

Latvia and Estonia
There is a spectrum of opinion among authors as to the classification of Latvia and Estonia, spanning from liberal democracy through ethnic democracy to ethnocracy. Will Kymlicka regards Estonia as a democracy, stressing the peculiar status of Russian-speakers as stemming from being at once partly transients, partly immigrants and partly natives.

British researcher Neil Melvin concludes that Estonia is moving towards a genuinely pluralist democratic society through its liberalization of citizenship and actively drawing of leaders of the Russian settler communities into the political process. James Hughes, in the United Nations Development Programme's Development and Transition, contends Latvia and Estonia are cases of 'ethnic democracy', where the state has been captured by the titular ethnic group and then used to promote 'nationalising' policies and alleged discrimination against Russophone minorities. (Development and Transition has also published papers disputing Hughes' contentions.)

Israeli researchers Oren Yiftachel and As'ad Ghanem consider Estonia as an ethnocracy. Israeli sociologist Sammy Smooha, of the University of Haifa, disagrees with Yiftachel, contending that the ethnocratic model developed by Yiftachel does not fit the case of Latvia and Estonia: they are not settler societies as their core ethnic groups are indigenous, nor did they expand territorially, nor have diasporas intervening in their internal affairs (as in the case of Israel for which Yiftachel originally developed his model).

Northern Ireland
Northern Ireland has been described as an ethnocracy by numerous scholars. Wendy Pullan describes gerrymandering of electoral districts to ensure Unionist domination and informal policies that led to the police force being overwhelmingly Protestant as features of the Unionist ethnocracy. Other elements included discriminatory housing and policies designed to encourage Catholic emigration. Ian Shuttleworth, Myles Gould and Paul Barr agree that the systematic bias against Catholics and Irish nationalists fit the criteria for describing Northern Ireland as an ethnocracy from the time of the partition of Ireland until at least 1972, but argue that after the suspension of the Stormont Parliament, and even more so after the Good Friday Agreement in 1998, ethnocracy was weakened, and that Northern Ireland cannot be plausibly described as an ethnocracy today.

Somalia
Somalia's parliamentary system is distributed via a fixed allocation along clan lines with the four major ethnic Somali clans (the Dir, Darod, Hawiye, and Rahanweyn) always having a guaranteed political majority in parliament irrespective of demographic changes.

South Africa
Until 1994, South Africa had institutionalized a highly ethnocratic state structure, apartheid. In his 1985 book Power-Sharing in South Africa, Arend Lijphart classified contemporaneous constitutional proposals to address the resulting conflict into four categories:

 majoritarian (one man, one vote)
 non-democratic (varieties of white domination)
 partitionist (creating new political entities)
 consociational (power-sharing by proportional representation and elite accommodation)

These illustrate the idea that state power can be distributed along two dimensions: legal-institutional and territorial. Along the legal-institutional dimension are singularism (power centralised according to membership in a specific group), pluralism (power distribution among defined groups according to relative numerical strength), and universalism (power distribution without any group-specific qualifications). On the territorial dimension are the unitary state, "intermediate restructuring" (within one formal sovereignty), and partition (creating separate political entities). Lijphart had argued strongly in favour of the consociational model.

Turkey
Turkey has been described as an ethnocracy by Bilge Azgın. Azgın points to government policies whose goals are the "exclusion, marginalization, or assimilation" of minority groups that are non-Turkish as the defining elements of Turkish ethnocracy. Israeli researcher As'ad Ghanem also considers Turkey an ethnocracy, while Jack Fong describes Turkey's policy of referring to its Kurdish minority as "mountain Turks" and its refusal to acknowledge any separate Kurdish identity as elements of the Turkish ethnocracy.

Uganda
Uganda under dictator Idi Amin Dada has also been described as an ethnocracy favouring certain indigenous groups over others, as well as for the ethnic cleansing of Indians in Uganda by Amin.

See also

 Dominant minority
 Ethnic nationalism
 Herrenvolk democracy
 Human rights in Estonia
 Ketuanan Melayu
 Nationalism
 South Africa under apartheid
 Superstratum
 White separatism
 White nationalism

References

Rule by a subset of population
Ethnic conflict
Ethnicity in politics
Politics and race
Ethnic nationalism
Ethnic supremacy
Minority rights